Derkach (Cyrillic: Деркач) is a Ukrainian surname meaning a ratchet, noisemaker. Notable people with the surname include:

Andrii Derkach (born 1967), Ukrainian politician and businessman
Andriy Derkach (footballer) (born 1985), Ukrainian football player
Borys Derkach (1964−2019), Soviet and Ukrainian footballer
Dariya Derkach (born 1993), Italian triple jumper and long jumper
Len Derkach (born 1945), Canadian politician
Leonid Derkach (1939−2022), Ukrainian politician, father of Andrii
Sergei Derkach (born 1966), Russian football player and coach
Volodymyr Derkach (born 1957), Ukrainian musician
Vyacheslav Derkach (born 1976), Ukrainian biathlete
Yana Derkach (born 1998), Ukrainian football player

See also
 
Dergach

Ukrainian-language surnames